The 2022 National Development League was the third division/tier of British speedway for the 2022 season. It is a semi-professional development league, containing the junior sides of many SGB Premiership and SGB Championship clubs.

Summary
Eight clubs competed for the League Championship, with Armadale, Belle Vue, Berwick, Kent, Leicester and champions Mildenhall all returning. Kent would switch venues from Central Park Stadium to the Iwade Speedway Stadium and would only enter the Royals in the National League. Oxford and Plymouth would also enter junior sides, taking the total to eight sides

The Championship Play Offs also returned in 2022 to determine the League Champions, as would the Knockout Cup. Leicester Lion Cubs dominated the season by winning the league and successfully defending their National League Knockout Cup title (from 2019) and winning the Pairs Championship.

Regular season
League Table

Fixtures & Results

League Scoring System
Home loss by any number of points = 0
Home draw = 1
Home win by any number of points = 3
Away loss by 7 points or more = 0
Away loss by 6 points or less = 1
Away draw = 2
Away win by between 1 and 6 points = 3
Away win by 7 points or more = 4

Championship Play Offs

Home team scores are in bold
Overall aggregate scores are in red

Final
First Leg

Second Leg

Knockout Cup
The 2022 National Development League Knockout Cup was the 23rd edition of the Knockout Cup for tier three teams. It returned after being cancelled in 2021 due to the COVID-19 pandemic.

Home team scores are in bold
Overall aggregate scores are in red

Final
First Leg

Second Leg

Pairs Championship
Result

Semi-finals

Final

Leading Averages

averages include NDL, KO Cup, min 6 matches

Riders' Championship
The 2022 edition of the National Development League Riders Championship, took place on Sunday 25 September at The Eddie Wright Raceway, Scunthorpe.
1st Jordan Jenkins 14
2nd Max Clegg 13 (after run off)
3rd Jason Edwards 13
4th Lee Complin 11
5th Ben Morley 10
5th Dan Thompson 10
7th Joe Thompson 9
7th Jack Kingston 9
9th Tom Woolley 7
9th Jack Smith 7
11th Ben Trigger 5
12th Jody Scott 4
13th Harry McGurk 3
14th Luke Harrison 2
14th Mason Watson 2
16th Luke Crang 1
17th Jack Shimelt (res) 0

Squads & final averages

Armadale Devils
 8.28
 7.29
 7.12
 6.95
 4.80
 4.38
 3.85
 2.50
 1.68

Belle Vue Colts
 8.72
 8.67
 8.30
 7.68
 6.75
 6.31
 5.61

Berwick Bullets
 9.44
 8.16
 7.17
 7.11
 5.32
 4.50
 3.87

Kent Royals
 12.00
 10.30
 10.00
 8.19
 6.14
 5.55
 4.22
 3.52
 2.61
 2.00

Leicester Lion Cubs
 10.81
 9.69
 9.29
 7.25
 6.11
 5.57
 5.12

Mildenhall Fen Tigers
 10.50
 7.06
 7.02
 7.00
 6.83
 6.21
 5.88

Oxford Chargers
 9.73
 9.65
 8.23
 6.63
 6.35
 5.25
 4.98
 2.91

Plymouth Centurions
 10.67
 8.83
 6.20
 5.96
 5.33
 4.93
 3.20
 0.80

See also
List of United Kingdom speedway league champions
Knockout Cup (speedway)

References

National League
National Development League
Speedway National League